Sdeh Bar Farm (Hebrew:  חַוַּת שְׂדֶה בָּר, Havat Sdeh Bar) is an Israeli settlement in the West Bank. Originally an Israeli outpost, illegal under Israeli law, it has been retroactively designated a suburb of Nokdim, located adjacent to the Palestinian village of Jubbet ad-Dib. Located south of Bethlehem near the foothills of Herodium, it falls under the jurisdiction of Gush Etzion Regional Council.

The international community considers Israeli settlements in the West Bank illegal under international law, but the Israeli government disputes this.

History
Sdeh Bar was established in 1998 as an outpost from Nokdim. It was retroactively authorised in 2005 as a neighborhood of Nokdim.

Sde Bar includes a residential program for troubled young Israeli men who lack familial support. It was run by the Ministry of Social Affairs and Social Services. In 2010, the program lost state funding due to reports of drugs and sexual abuse.

Baruch Feldbaum, head of security at Sdeh Bar, was convicted of assaulting and injuring Palestinians in aggravated circumstances after an altercation with shepherds at the settlement.

Since 2012 a boutique dairy restaurant has been operating at the settlement.

References

External links
 http://www.sde-bar.org.il/?lat=en

Buildings and structures in the West Bank
Israeli settlements in the West Bank
1998 establishments in the Palestinian territories
Unauthorized Israeli settlements
Israeli outposts